Matthew James Lindland (born May 17, 1970), also known as The Law, is an American retired mixed martial artist, Olympic wrestler, speaker, actor, coach, entrepreneur and politician. He won the Oregon Republican Party's nomination for the Oregon House of Representatives, District 52 seat on May 20, 2008. He also started an apparel company named Dirty Boxer. In mixed martial arts, Lindland competed primarily in the Middleweight division for the UFC, Strikeforce. Affliction, the IFL, Cage Rage,  the WFA, and BodogFIGHT.

Wrestling
Lindland started wrestling at age 15 at Gladstone High School in Gladstone, Oregon. In 1991, he won the junior college 158 lbs national title wrestling for Clackamas Community College.

Lindland then went on to wrestle at the University of Nebraska, Division I of the NCAA. He won the Big Eight title at 158 in 1993. Following up that title, he had a record of 36-0 for the 1993 season going into the National Tournament, and was the #1 ranked wrestler for his weight class. He suffered an upset in the first round of the tournament, however, and did not place. Following his college career Lindland began to compete in both Freestyle and Greco-Roman events, finding success in both but ultimately deciding to concentrate all his effort upon the Greco-Roman style.

The high point of his career was when he represented the United States in Greco-Roman Wrestling at the 2000 Summer Olympics in the 69–76 kg weight category, winning the silver medal, followed by a silver medal at the 2001 World Championships in Patras, Greece at 85 kg. His mixed martial arts career had actually started three years prior, having fought at events such as IVC 6, and it is notable that he continued to compete in amateur wrestling as well as mma following his Olympic competition. Following his first UFC match, at UFC 29, Lindland managed to secure a silver medal at the world championships and a U.S. National title in 2001. He was still a top 10 ranked wrestler in his weight class for the nation until 2004, when his wrestling career finally came to an end, already being a veteran of over a dozen MMA fights as well, including competing in a title match.

Lindland was notable for having secured his spot on the US Olympic team through the courts. In the finals of the United States Olympic trials, Lindland lost to Keith Sieracki, whom Lindland had accused of tripping him (under the rules of Greco-Roman wrestling, athletes are not permitted the use of their legs for advantage in defense of offensive moves). After appealing, an arbitrator ordered a rematch for Lindland and Sieracki, which Lindland won 9–0.

The USOC however sought to keep Sieracki on the team, and appealed in federal court. A federal district judge, then a three-judge panel of the 7th U.S. Circuit Court of Appeals, both decided in Lindland's favor. A request for a hearing by the USOC in the Supreme Court of the United States was denied, which settled Lindland's status on the team.  Lindland would later earn his nickname "The Lawyer" from the protracted case.
After the Olympics Lindland returned to Oregon where he would open a used car dealership named "USA Auto Wholesale".

Mixed martial arts
Lindland started mixed martial arts training with Randy Couture, Dan Henderson and others at Team Quest. He won four fights in the middleweight division of the Ultimate Fighting Championship before losing to Murilo Bustamante in a championship match at UFC 37.

Lindland's next loss came at the hands of Falaniko Vitale, who Lindland attempted to slam, only to knock himself out in the process. After his dismissal from the UFC, Lindland continued to corner fighters at UFC events such as in B.J. Penn's bout against Georges St-Pierre. He has also continued his professional MMA career in IFL and BodogFight with five wins and two losses, with the two losses coming outside of his weightclass against the future UFC Light Heavyweight Champion Quinton Jackson and the former Pride Heavyweight Champion Fedor Emelianenko. After his World Fighting Alliance loss to Jackson, Lindland joined the International Fight League, which also marked Lindland's debut as an IFL team coach – he fought against Jeremy Horn. Lindland won by TKO early in the second round. He then beat Carlos Newton at IFL Houston at the 1:43 mark of Round 2 by submission due to guillotine choke. Lindland defeated Fabio Negao via unanimous decision on July 19, 2008 at Affliction: Banned in Anaheim, California.
At Affliction: Day of Reckoning on January 24, 2009, he was defeated by Vitor Belfort.
Lindland is the former coach of the Portland Wolfpack in the International Fight League.

Strikeforce
On April 13, 2009, Lindland signed a three-fight deal with Strikeforce and made his debut against Ronaldo Souza at Strikeforce: Evolution on December 19, 2009. Lindland lost the fight via first-round submission by way of arm triangle choke.

Lindland headlined Strikeforce Challengers 8 on May 21, 2010, in his hometown of Portland, Oregon, defeating Kevin Casey.

He fought Robbie Lawler at Strikeforce: Henderson vs. Babalu II on December 4, 2010. Lindland was knocked out fifty seconds into the first round.

Post-Strikeforce
Lindland was choked unconscious by Mamed Khalidov at KSW 16.

There is currently a documentary called "Fighting Politics" about Lindland and his MMA career.

In addition, he is a "Mixed Martial Arts Management" instructor for the online sports career training school, Sports Management Worldwide, in Portland, Oregon. In 2021, Lindland was promoted to the rank of black belt in Brazilian Jiu Jitsu, by Renzo Gracie.

Personal life and politics

Matt Lindland and his wife Angie have two children, a son, Big Jim, and a daughter.
Since retiring from MMA Lindland has pursued other sports such as professional rafting, achieving an impressive six time Western White Water Series Championship thus far. He is the 2013 World Team Greco-Roman head coach as well as Head Coach at Team Quest. He does seminars all over the world as well as public speaking.

On March 11, 2008, Lindland filed as a Republican to run for the Oregon House of Representatives in District 52. The seat was formerly held by Republican Patti Smith. Lindland defeated fellow Republican Phyllis Thiemann in the May 20, 2008 primary, 58 to 42 percent. He advanced to the general election and was defeated by Hood River, Oregon Democrat Suzanne VanOrman by around 52% to Lindland's 48%.

Film and television
Lindland appears in the award-winning MMA documentary Fight Life, released in 2013. The film was directed by James Z. Feng and produced by RiLL Films.

Matt Lindland and Ed Herman guest starred on the TV series Leverage on July 22, 2011. Lindland played an MMA fighter.

Lindland has also appeared in the HBO hit television show Oz, acting and performing stunts. He was also featured in the Mary Kate and Ashley Olsen film New York Minute, again acting and performing stunts.

Coaching
Lindland founded the North West kids wrestling program and coached at two of the top wrestling clubs in the U.S.: Cobra Wrestling and Peninsula. That same year, he also started working with Chael Sonnen at West Linn High School. In 1996, Lindland moved back to Lincoln, Nebraska to take a job as an assistant wrestling coach at the University of Nebraska where he coached until 2000. During his tenure at Nebraska, Lindland coached NCAA champions and multiple All-Americans. He continues to work with USA Wrestling to this day.

In 2000, Lindland started coaching wrestling and MMA at his Team Quest gym in Portland, Oregon. He is still coaching wrestling, kickboxing, MMA, and the professional and amateur fight teams at Team Quest. In 2013 he was selected as the World team coach for the US Greco-Roman wrestling team.

Lindland is a volunteer assistant coach at his alma mater, Clackamas Community College. The program has taken a U-turn under the coaching of Coach Josh Rhoden and Matt Lindland, placing high in the NJCAA National Tournament in recent years.

Hall of Fame
In October 2013 Matt Lindland was inducted into the Alan & Gloria Rice Greco-Roman Hall of Champions  inside the National Wrestling Hall of Fame Dan Gable Museum in Waterloo, Iowa.

Championships and accomplishments
International Fighting Championship
IFC 6 Tournament winner

Mixed martial arts record 

|-
| Loss
| align=center| 22–9
| Mamed Khalidov
| Technical Submission (guillotine choke)
| KSW 16: Khalidov vs. Lindland
| 
| align=center| 1
| align=center| 1:35
| Gdańsk, Poland
| 
|-
| Loss
| align=center| 22–8
| Robbie Lawler
| KO (punches)
| Strikeforce: Henderson vs. Babalu II
| 
| align=center| 1
| align=center| 0:50
| St Louis, Missouri, United States
| 
|-
| Win
| align=center| 22–7
| Kevin Casey
| TKO (punches)
| Strikeforce Challengers: Lindland vs. Casey
| 
| align=center| 3
| align=center| 3:41
| Portland, Oregon, United States
| 
|-
| Loss
| align=center| 21–7
| Ronaldo Souza
| Submission (arm-triangle choke)
| Strikeforce: Evolution
| 
| align=center| 1
| align=center| 4:18
| San Jose, California, United States
| 
|-
| Loss
| align=center| 21–6
| Vitor Belfort
| KO (punches)
| Affliction: Day of Reckoning
| 
| align=center| 1
| align=center| 0:37
| Anaheim, California, United States
| 
|-
| Win
| align=center| 21–5
| Fabio Nascimento
| Decision (unanimous)
| Affliction: Banned
| 
| align=center| 3
| align=center| 5:00
| Anaheim, California, United States
| 
|-
| Loss
| align=center| 20–5
| Fedor Emelianenko
| Submission (armbar)
| BodogFIGHT: Clash of the Nations
| 
| align=center| 1
| align=center| 2:58
| St. Petersburg, Russia
| 
|-
| Win
| align=center| 20–4
| Carlos Newton
| Submission (guillotine choke)
| IFL: Houston
| 
| align=center| 2
| align=center| 1:43
| Houston, Texas, United States
| 
|-
| Win
| align=center| 19–4
| Jeremy Horn
| TKO (punches)
| IFL: Portland
| 
| align=center| 2
| align=center| 0:21
| Portland, Oregon, United States
| 
|-
| Loss
| align=center| 18–4
| Quinton Jackson
| Decision (split)
| WFA: King of the Streets
| 
| align=center| 3
| align=center| 5:00
| Los Angeles, California, United States
| 
|-
| Win
| align=center| 18–3
| Mike Van Arsdale
| Submission (guillotine choke)
| Raze MMA: Fight Night
| 
| align=center| 1
| align=center| 3:38
| San Diego, California, United States
| 
|-
| Win
| align=center| 17–3
| Fabio Leopoldo
| Submission (rear-naked choke)
| GFC: Gracie vs. Hammer House
| 
| align=center| 3
| align=center| 3:25
| Columbus, Ohio, United States
| 
|-
| Win
| align=center| 16–3
| Antonio Schembri
| TKO (punches)
| Cage Rage 14
| 
| align=center| 3
| align=center| 3:33
| London, England, UK
| 
|-
| Win
| align=center| 15–3
| Joe Doerksen
| Decision (unanimous)
| UFC 54: Boiling Point
| 
| align=center| 3
| align=center| 5:00
| Las Vegas, Nevada, United States
| 
|-
| Win
| align=center| 14–3
| Travis Lutter
| Submission (guillotine choke)
| UFC 52: Couture vs Liddell
| 
| align=center| 2
| align=center| 3:32
| Las Vegas, Nevada, United States
| 
|-
| Win
| align=center| 13–3
| Landon Showalter
| Submission (armbar)
| Sportfight 8: Justice
| 
| align=center| 1
| align=center| 2:43
| Gresham, Oregon, United States
| 
|-
| Win
| align=center| 12–3
| Mark Weir
| TKO (doctor stoppage)
| Cage Rage 9
| 
| align=center| 1
| align=center| 5:00
| London, England, United Kingdom
| 
|-
| Loss
| align=center| 11–3
| David Terrell
| KO (punches)
| UFC 49
| 
| align=center| 1
| align=center| 0:24
| Las Vegas, Nevada, United States
| 
|-
| Win
| align=center| 11–2
| Tony Fryklund
| Decision (unanimous)
| ROTR 5: Rumble on the Rock 5
| 
| align=center| 3
| align=center| 5:00
| Honolulu, Hawaii, United States
| 
|-
| Win
| align=center| 10–2
| Falaniko Vitale
| Submission (strikes)
| UFC 45
| 
| align=center| 3
| align=center| 4:23
| Uncasville, Connecticut, United States
| 
|-
| Loss
| align=center| 9–2
| Falaniko Vitale
| KO (slam)
| UFC 43
| 
| align=center| 1
| align=center| 1:56
| Las Vegas, Nevada, United States
| 
|-
| Win
| align=center| 9–1
| Phil Baroni
| Decision (unanimous)
| UFC 41
| 
| align=center| 3
| align=center| 5:00
| Atlantic City, New Jersey, United States
| 
|-
| Win
| align=center| 8–1
| Ivan Salaverry
| Decision (unanimous)
| UFC 39
| 
| align=center| 3
| align=center| 5:00
| Uncasville, Connecticut, United States
| 
|-
| Loss
| align=center| 7–1
| Murilo Bustamante
| Submission (guillotine choke)
| UFC 37
| 
| align=center| 3
| align=center| 1:33
| Bossier City, Louisiana, United States
| 
|-
| Win
| align=center| 7–0
| Pat Miletich
| TKO (punches)
| UFC 36
| 
| align=center| 1
| align=center| 3:09
| Las Vegas, Nevada, United States
| 
|-
| Win
| align=center| 6–0
| Phil Baroni
| Decision (majority)
| UFC 34
| 
| align=center| 3
| align=center| 5:00
| Las Vegas, Nevada, United States
| 
|-
| Win
| align=center| 5–0
| Ricardo Almeida
| DQ (illegal up-kicks)
| UFC 31
| 
| align=center| 3
| align=center| 4:21
| Atlantic City, New Jersey, United States
| 
|-
| Win
| align=center| 4–0
| Yoji Anjo
| TKO (punches)
| UFC 29
| 
| align=center| 1
| align=center| 2:58
| Tokyo, Japan
| 
|-
| Win
| align=center| 3–0
| Travis Fulton
| Submission (choke)
| IFC 6: Battle at the Four Bears
| 
| align=center| 1
| align=center| 22:13
| New Town, North Dakota, United States
| 
|-
| Win
| align=center| 2–0
| Mark Waters
| TKO (submission to punches)
| IFC 6: Battle at the Four Bears
| 
| align=center| 1
| align=center| 2:20
| New Town, North Dakota, United States
| 
|-
| Win
| align=center| 1–0
| Karo Davtyan
| TKO (punches)
| World Fighting Federation
| 
| align=center| 1
| align=center| 8:34
| Birmingham, Alabama, United States
|

Submission grappling 
ADCC World Submission Wrestling Championships

Record of opponents:

 Won: Yushin Okami
 Lost: Ronaldo 'Jacare' Souza, Fabricio Werdum (armbar)

Folkstyle wrestling 

 NJCAA Collegiate Championships 1991 158 lbs: 1st place
 NCAA Division 1 Tournament Seed 1993 163 lbs: #1 seed; did not place

Freestyle wrestling 

USA University Freestyle Championships
 1992 163 lbs: 1st place
 1994 163 lbs: 1st place

Greco-Roman wrestling 

USA Senior Greco-Roman Championships
 1995 163 lbs: 1st place
 1998 167.5 lbs: 1st place
 1999 167.5 lbs: 1st place
 2000 167.5 lbs: 1st place
 2001 187.2 lbs: 1st place

FILA World Championships
 1998 167 lbs: 6th place
 2001 187 lbs: 2nd place

US Olympics
 2000 167.5 lbs: silver medal

References

External links 
 Official website of Coach Matt Lindland
 
 
 
 
 Matt Lindland at the National Wrestling Hall of Fame
 The big fat book of grappling credentials. - Sherdog Mixed Martial Arts Forums
 Custom Screen Printing, Embroidery, Promotional Products, Fulfillment and More

Living people
1970 births
American male mixed martial artists
American practitioners of Brazilian jiu-jitsu
People awarded a black belt in Brazilian jiu-jitsu
Mixed martial artists from Oregon
Middleweight mixed martial artists
Mixed martial artists utilizing collegiate wrestling
Mixed martial artists utilizing Greco-Roman wrestling
Mixed martial artists utilizing freestyle wrestling
Mixed martial artists utilizing Brazilian jiu-jitsu
Olympic silver medalists for the United States in wrestling
Wrestlers at the 2000 Summer Olympics
American male sport wrestlers
Oregon Republicans
Sportspeople from Oregon City, Oregon
World Wrestling Championships medalists
Medalists at the 2000 Summer Olympics
Pan American Games medalists in wrestling
Pan American Games gold medalists for the United States
Wrestlers at the 1999 Pan American Games
Medalists at the 1999 Pan American Games
Ultimate Fighting Championship male fighters
University of Nebraska–Lincoln alumni